Eyqer Bolagh (سرچشمه) (
روستای  سرچشمه (ایقربلاغ) یکی از سرسبزترین روستا های حومه استان البرز میباشد ، با فاصله بسیار نزدیک به آزادراه تهران کرج
دارای آب و هوای بسیار عالی کلیه امکانات رفاهی برای سکونت دائم که امروزه به یکی از مناطق گردشگری و ییلاقی حومه تهران و البرز تبدیل شده

امکانات رفاهی : هایپر مارکت ، نانوایی ، ایستگاه تاکسی ، تعمیرات موبایل ، ابزار فروشی ، بانک و عابر بانک ....

روستا های اطراف :

شمالا به شهرک برند جهان ویلا

جنوبا به روستا های نمکلان و اسماعیل آباد

شرقا‌ به روستای سعید آباد و تهراندشت
 
غربا روستای قاسم آباد

is a village in Saidabad Rural District, in the Central District of Savojbolagh County, Alborz Province, Iran. At the 2006 census, its population was 1,045, in 263 families.

References 

Populated places in Savojbolagh County